Senator Moe may refer to:

Donald Moe (1942–2017), Minnesota State Senate
Mary Sheehy Moe (fl. 2010s), Montana State Senate
Roger Moe (born 1944), Minnesota State Senate